Page of Cups (or Jack or Knave of Cups) is a card used in Latin suited playing cards which include tarot decks. It is part of what tarot card readers call the "Minor Arcana"

Tarot cards are used throughout much of Europe to play tarot card games.

In English-speaking countries, where the games are largely unknown, Tarot cards came to be utilized primarily for divinatory purposes.

Divination usage
This card can represent a sweet-natured child who loves home life and family but may struggle in school. This child enjoys the arts and is very spiritual. This child is considered to be a dreamer. The child may be psychic. Often depicted as a child because of their symbolism of optimism and growth. With the child's less serious approach to life, they attract happiness.  

This page has a powerful imagination and intuition, as well. Creativity and vision are among this person's blessings. The page's positive outlook often creates great opportunity and results. This card is centered on emotion and opening up those emotions to allow compassion and love for others.    

As a situation it represents an opportunity for artistic or creative learning and expansion. Often used to bring new opportunities for relationships. 

Known to bring good news. Reveals emotional, intimate, and spiritual needs of a person.

Key Meanings 
The key meanings of the Page of Cups:

 Announcement
 Birth
 Creative ideas
 Good news
 Message

When this card is drawn, the message indicates hope and positive change. The message is an announcement that you are on the right path. A person from the past may be bearing a specific message for you. Traditionally, this new message is often brought by a person that is younger than you. This message reveals a positive change that may indicate fertility or new creative ideas. 

This card encourages love, laughter, and positivity. There is an appreciation for expressing emotions freely. This card can create new creative ideas and reveal artistic qualities. Listening to your body mentally, physically, and spiritually is a key element to this card. 

Regarding emotional struggles, this card calls for the need to express love deeper. When the love becomes deeper, you become more aligned with your life path.

Drawing this card identifies that good news is on the way. 

The past meaning for this card indicates awareness of past challenges and how those challenges were overcome. The present meaning for this card reveals the positivity in life and the new message that awaits. The future meaning for this card shows the opportunity that must be taken and ways to heal with previous emotional issues. This card is optimistic in nature, therefore, drawing this card will likely provide great enthusiasm and exciting opportunities.

Symbols 
The symbols of the Page of Cups indicate:

 The page is holding a cup with a blue fish inside that indicates creativity and emotion.
 The monochromatic blue color throughout the card indicates a message of communication.
 The bright flowers on the page's clothes indicate happiness, growth, and beauty.
 The feather that the page is wearing reveals spiritual awakenings and reward for their wisdom and communication.
 The waves behind the Page of Cups indicate waves of emotion.
The page is considered young which symbolize optimism and opportunity.

Reversed Meaning 
Reversed meaning of the Page of Cups reveals:

 Bad news 
 Immaturity or emotional instability 
 Disappointments regarding intimate or platonic relationships
 Indulging in harmful addictions (e.g. alcohol or smoking abuse)
 Neglectful of important matters
 Seeking attention
 Canceled events and trips
 Obsession

Reversed meanings reveals negative consequences but acts as caution. The reversed meaning is intended to be seen as guidance to create a more positive outcome.

In popular culture 
 Page of Cups is an instrumental on the 2003 album Voyageur by electronic music project Enigma.

References

Suit of Cups